.gift is an active generic top-level domain (gTLD) of the Domain Name System (DNS) used in the internet. The gTLD's intended use is for gift shops, craft artists, department stores, and charitable organizations.

History 
The .gift gTLD was proposed to ICANN by Uniregistry. On 18 January 2014, their proposal application succeeded and was delegated to the Root Zone.

Contact signed 
On 17 October 2013 Unregistry received a Registry Agreement signed by ICANN for the .gift gTLD after passing the Initial Evaluation.

References 
Generic top-level domains

External links 

 .gift domain Official site
 .gift on ICANNWiki

Generic top-level domains